José María Castiñeira de Dios (March 30, 1920 – May 2, 2015) was an Argentine poet.

Biography
Castiñeira de Dios was born on March 30, 1920 in Ushuaia. When he was 20, his poem Elegía del clavel was published in the literary supplement named LA NACION, who has led by Eduardo Mallea. When he was 21, he won the First Municipal Prize for Literature for his poem Del ímpetu dichoso along with Manuel Mujica Lainez and Silvina Bullrich.

In April 2015, he was hospitalized for twenty days after complications from pneumonia. He died on May 2, 2015 at 95.

References

1920 births
2015 deaths
20th-century Argentine poets
20th-century Argentine writers
20th-century Argentine male writers
21st-century Argentine poets
21st-century Argentine writers
21st-century Argentine male writers
Argentine male poets
Deaths from pneumonia in Argentina
People from Ushuaia